Dharmendra Bikram Nembang(Nepali:धर्मेन्द्र बिक्रम नेम्वाङ) is a Nepalese poet. His is the pioneer of Multicolourism(सामान्य बहुरँगवाद). His fellow poets for literary struggle on Multicolourism are Swapnil Smriti(स्वप्निल स्मृति), Samadarshi Kainla (समदर्शि काईला), and Chandrabir Tumbapo (चन्द्रवीर तुम्बापो). He introduced new realm of postmodern literature in Nepal with the publication of his first anthology of poems entitled Bheerai Bheerko rang (भीरै भीरको रङ).

Publications

 Bheerai Bheerko Rang ra Arko Sanskaran
 Dharmendra Nembangka Kabitaharu
 Samanya Bahurangabad Euta Travelling Philosophyko Parikalpana
 Rato Bagh
 Yuba Bichar Yuba Nepal, Aamul Paribartanko Pakshama Ek Avadharana

Literary Awards
Mr. Dharmendra Bikram Nembang was awarded with Swadesh Puraskar, 2016 by Hong Kong Sajha Srinkhala in December 2016.

References

1976 births
Living people